Björn Jakobson, (born 14 August 1934 in Stockholm) is a Swedish entrepreneur. 

In 1961, he started the company Babybjörn. The initial product was a bouncy chair that he acquired on a trip to the United States,  He and his wife, the designer Lillemor Jakobson, are co-owners of Lillemor Design AB, the parent company of the group that includes Baby Björn.

In June 2012, the Jakobsons opened a new museum near Stockholm, on the island of Värmdö, called Artipelag.

In 2012 he was awarded His Majesty The King’s Medal “for significant contributions to Swedish industry”.

References 

Swedish business executives
Living people
1934 births